Allan Keith Grant (11 February 1941 – 8 April 2000), generally known by his initials as A.K. Grant, was a New Zealand writer, historian, critic and humorist.

Grant was born in Whanganui, and in 1964 he received his LL.B from the University of Canterbury and moved to London for 12 years. On his return to New Zealand in 1976, he began writing, and released The Paua and the Glory , his history of New Zealand letters in 1982. At the same time he wrote a regular column for the New Zealand Listener.

He also wrote for television, particularly in partnership with David McPhail and Jon Gadsby. Credits include A Week of It, McPhail and Gadsby and Letter to Blanchy.

The A. K. Grant Memorial Trophy was established in October 2000 and is awarded to the best speaker in celebrity debates held alternately at the Christchurch and Otago Arts Festivals.

References 

NZ Book Council
 

1941 births
2000 deaths
New Zealand humorists
University of Canterbury alumni
New Zealand satirists
People from Whanganui
20th-century New Zealand writers
New Zealand screenwriters
Male screenwriters
20th-century screenwriters